Wali Khan may refer to:

 Wali Khan (khoja), a Turkestani khoja, ruler of Kashgar in 1857
 Khan Abdul Wali Khan (1917–2006), Pashtun Pakistani politician
 'Abdu'l Wali Khan (1925–2008), an Afghan Prince
 Asfandyar Wali Khan (born 1949), son of Khan Abdul Wali Khan, a Pakistani politician
 Wali Khan Amin Shah, freedom fighter during the Soviet invasion of Afghanistan and a convicted terrorist
 Mufti Zar Wali Khan, a Pakistani Muslim cleric
 Ahmad Wali Khan Karzai (1961–2011), Afghan politician, brother of president Karzai
 Wali Khan Babar (1982–2011), Pakistani journalist

See also
 Shokan Walikhanuli (1835–1865), Kazakh scholar and traveller